Harnirjodh "George" Chahal  is a Canadian politician who is the Member of Parliament for Calgary Skyview as a member of the Liberal Party of Canada. Before entering federal politics, he was a Councillor for Ward 5 on the Calgary City Council from 2017 to 2021.

Federal politics
On July 8, 2021, Chahal, who was originally slated to seek re-election to city council, announced that he was nominated to be the candidate for the Liberal Party in Calgary Skyview in the 2021 Canadian federal election.

On September 20, 2021, Chahal won the election, making him the only victorious Liberal candidate in Calgary (incumbent Conservative MPs won in the city's other nine ridings) and only the seventh Liberal ever to represent a Calgary riding in the party's history.

Election flyer controversy
On September 24, 2021, the Calgary Police's Anti-Corruption Unit announced that they were investigating George Chahal over a doorbell camera video that appeared to show Chahal removing a flyer for his Conservative opponent, Jag Sahota, from a constituent's door on the eve of the election.

Chahal's campaign said that he removed the flyer supposedly because it identified an incorrect polling location for the voter's area; however, the homeowner said that Chahal's flyer was the one with the incorrect information, and that Sahota's matched the official information given to them by Elections Canada.

In January 2022, Chahal accepted and paid a $500 administrative monetary penalty assessed by the Commissioner of Canada Elections in the matter, saying, "It’s just a late night on an election campaign. Call it a dumb mistake or brain fogit really doesn’t matter why I did what I did. I think what matters is I did it. And I acknowledged it fully, openly, publicly."

Electoral record

References

External links

Members of the House of Commons of Canada from Alberta
Liberal Party of Canada MPs
21st-century Canadian politicians
Calgary city councillors
Living people
1975 births